The chapters of the manga series Reborn!, titled as Katekyō Hitman Reborn! in Japan, are written and drawn by Akira Amano and have been serialized in the shōnen manga anthology Weekly Shōnen Jump by Shueisha since its premiere on May 31, 2004 and ran until its conclusion on November 12, 2012, with the final 42nd volume released in March 2013. The series revolves around the life of 14-year-old Tsunayoshi "Tsuna" Sawada, a timid boy who finds out that he is the next in line to become the boss of the most powerful Mafia organization, the Vongola Family. As such, the Vongola's most powerful hitman, a gun-toting infant named Reborn, is sent to tutor Tsuna on how to become a respectable boss.

The manga has been adapted into an anime series by Artland and it premiered on the Japanese network TV Tokyo on October 7, 2006. On September 21, 2006, Viz Media announced that they licensed the manga for an English language release in North America. The manga has also been licensed in France by Glénat, in Spain by Planeta DeAgostini, and is released in Germany by Tokyopop.

The individual chapters are published in tankōbon volumes by Shueisha. The first volume was released on October 4, 2004, forty two volumes have been released. Viz released the first collected volume on October 3, 2006 under their "Shōnen Jump Advanced" imprint, and a total of sixteen volumes have been released.

Volume list

Volumes 1–20

Volumes 21–42

References

External links
Shueisha's official Reborn! website  
Viz Media's official Reborn! manga section

Reborn!
Chapters